Dushan Hemantha (born 24 May 1994) is a Sri Lankan cricketer. He made his first-class debut for Colts Cricket Club in the 2013–14 Premier Trophy on 21 February 2014. In July 2022, he was signed by the Dambulla Giants for the third edition of the Lanka Premier League.

References

External links
 

1994 births
Living people
Sri Lankan cricketers
Badureliya Sports Club cricketers
Colts Cricket Club cricketers
Sri Lanka Navy Sports Club cricketers
Place of birth missing (living people)